"Disappear" is the fourth and final single from American rock band Hoobastank's second studio album, The Reason (2003). Released as a single on October 18, 2004, "Disappear" reached number 24 on the US Billboard Hot Modern Rock Tracks chart.

Music video
The music video for the song switches between footage from live Hoobastank shows during their 2004 tour (supporting the release of The Reason), and footage of them performing the song at the Utah State Fairgrounds, in Salt Lake City during a local radio station's music festival. The video was directed by Marc Webb and produced by Hagai Shaham. It is the last music video to feature bassist Markku Lappalainen as he left the band after Hoobastank's 2005 Summer Tour.

Track listing
European and Australian CD single
 "Disappear" (radio edit) – 4:07
 "Same Direction" (acoustic version) – 3:29
 "Just One" (album version) – 3:19
 "Disappear" (video)

Credits and personnel
Credits are lifted from the European CD single liner notes and The Reason album booklet.

Studios
 Recorded at Bay 7 Studios (Valley Village, Los Angeles) and Sparky Dark Studios (Calabasas, California)
 Strings recorded at Capitol Studios (Hollywood, California)
 Mixed at Image Recording (Hollywood, California)
 Mastered at Precision Mastering (Los Angeles)

Personnel

 Daniel Estrin – music, guitar
 Douglas Robb – lyrics, vocals
 Markku Lappalainen – bass
 Chris Hesse – drums
 Howard Benson – production
 Mike Plotnikoff – recording
 Casey Stone – recording (strings)
 Chris Lord-Alge – mixing
 Deborah Lurie – string arrangement
 Tom Baker – mastering

Charts

Release history

References

Hoobastank songs
2003 songs
2005 singles
Island Records singles
Music videos directed by Marc Webb
Song recordings produced by Howard Benson
Songs written by Dan Estrin
Songs written by Doug Robb